Dr. Rose Basile Green (1914-2003) was an American scholar, poet, and educator. Among her publications were a study of Italian-American writers, titled The Italian American Novel: A Document of the Interaction of Two Cultures (1974), and several volumes of poetry, specializing in the sonnet form. She was also a founder of Cabrini College in Radnor, Pennsylvania, and the first chair of its English department.

Early life and education 

Rose Basile was born on December 19, 1914, in New Rochelle, New York, the daughter of Salvatore and Carolina Galgano Basile. Her father's family migrated to the United States from the town of Calitri in southern Italy. She grew up on a farm in Harwinton, Connecticut, where she and her siblings went to school in a one-room schoolhouse. She received a B.A. in English from the College of New Rochelle in 1935, an M.A. in Italian studies from Columbia University in 1941, and a Ph.D. in American civilization from the University of Pennsylvania in 1962.

Career 

After earning her B.A., she spent a year in Torrington, Connecticut, working for the Works Progress Administration's Federal Writers' Project. Afterwards she remained in the area for six more years, teaching English and Italian at Torrington High School and dramatics in the night school program. From 1942 to 1943, she was registrar and associate professor of English at the University of Tampa. From 1943 to 1953, she wrote radio scripts for the National Broadcasting Company. She taught English at Temple University from 1953 to 1957.

In 1957, she co-founded Cabrini College and became the first chairman of its English Department. She taught there until she retired in 1970. After retiring from teaching in 1970, she continued to publish poetry and scholarly works. In 1975, she published The Italian American Novel: A Document of the Interaction of Two Cultures, which examines the work of 70 Italian-American writers. It was the first major scholarly work of its kind, and laid the groundwork for analysis of recurring themes in Italian-American literature, such as the "isolated immigrant" and the "alien marginalized by the established society." Her sonnet collection, Primo Vino (1975), also celebrates Italian Americans, focusing on the family, the home, community life, outstanding Italian Americans, and residents of "Little Italy."

Personal life and legacy 

She married Raymond S. Green, a broadcasting executive, on June 20, 1942. The couple had two children. She had been living in Lafayette Hill, Pennsylvania, when she died on April 30, 2003.

Historian Frank Cavaioli named her an influential Italian American, writing:

Scholar/poet Rose Basile Green has shaped twentieth century awareness of Italian American literature. Her seminal work on the Italian American novel and her poems celebrating Italian heroes and Italian themes have contributed to the rich tapestry of American culture. Her career has served as a model in the women's movement for respect and equality, especially Italian American women.

Memberships 
She was a member of the following organizations, among others:

 Academy of American Poets
 American Academy of Political and Social Science
 American Studies Association
 American Association of University Women
 American Library Association
 Modern Language Association
 National Council of Teachers of English
 National Italian American Foundation (member of board of directors; vice president)
 Cosmopolitan Club of Philadelphia

Awards 
She received the following awards and honors:

 Humanities Award, Nationalities Service Center (Philadelphia), 1975, for The Italian-American Novel
 Woman of the Year Award, Sons of Italy of America, 1975, for The Italian-American Novel and Primo Vino
 City of Philadelphia Citation, 1975
 Agnes C. Brothers Pathway of Life Award, National Federation of State Poetry Societies, 1976
 National Award in Literature, Daughters of the American Revolution, 1976, for 76 for Philadelphia
 National Award in Literature, Association of Italian American Women ("Amita"), 1976
 National Award from National Italian American Foundation, 1978, for Woman, the Second Coming
 Appointment as Distinguished Daughter of Pennsylvania from state of Pennsylvania, 1978, for Woman, the Second Coming
 Ursula Laurus Citation, College of New Rochelle Alumnae, 1980
 Humanitarian Award, Chapel of Four Chaplains (Philadelphia), 1980
 National Award of Merit, Philadelphia Art Alliance, 1981
 Graduates Award for Distinguished Achievement, Columbia University, 1986
 Cavalier of Republic of Italy
 Ph.D., Gwynedd Mercy College and Cabrini College

Works 
 The Evolution of Italian American Fiction (1962)
 The Cabrinian Philosophy of Education (1967)
 The Violet and the Flame (1968)
 To Reason Why (1971)
 Primo Vino (1974)
 The Italian American Novel: A Document of the Interaction of Two Cultures (1974)
 Seventy-six for Philadelphia (1975)
 Woman: The Second Coming (1977)
 Songs of Ourselves (1982)
 The Pennsylvania People (1984)
 Mother Frances Xavier Cabrini (1984), with Saverio de Maria
 Challenger Countdown (1988)
 Five Hundred Years of America, 1492-1992 (1992)
 The Distaff Side: Great Women of American History'' (1995)

References 

1914 births
2003 deaths
Writers from New Rochelle, New York
People from Harwinton, Connecticut
20th-century American women writers
American writers of Italian descent
20th-century American educators
20th-century American poets
American women poets
Educators from New York (state)
20th-century American women educators
21st-century American women